Carole Montgomery is an American standup comedian, writer, producer, director and actress.

Early life
Montgomery was born April 19, 1958 in Brooklyn, New York, where she lived until she moved into Manhattan in the early 1980s.

Career
In her early career she performed in various comedy clubs in the NYC area including the legendary Catch a Rising Star and Who's on First, both now shuttered. In 1987 she made the move out to Los Angeles with her husband Todd. It is in LA that Montgomery's television appearances started to multiply. She has been featured in over 2 dozen television shows, including Showtime's Comedy All Stars 6 with Don Rickles and Politically Incorrect with Bill Maher. The San Antonio Times called Montgomery "one of the pioneering female comics of the modern era."

In 1992 she had her only child, a son, James Layne Montgomery. Soon after, while she was playing at The Riviera Comedy Club in Las Vegas, she was asked to step in to the Las Vegas revue Crazy Girls which turned into a 5-year run. She was then asked to join Midnight Fantasy at the Luxor Hotel where she remained for 3 years. During her time in Las Vegas, Montgomery wrote and performed her one-woman show Confessions of a PT&A MOM in various theatres.

In 2006 she returned to NYC with her family. That year she was one of 10 contestants on Nick at Nite's The Search for the Funniest Mom in America reality competition. She has also appeared on Comics Unleashed with Byron Allen, and on the TV Guide Network's Standup in Stilettos.

Montgomery was also a co-producer of the NY Underground Comedy Festival which in its heyday was dedicated to furthering the art of standup comedy.

In 2010 Montgomery joined forces with Armed Forces Entertainment to bring comedy overseas to the US military. She has been to over a dozen countries including Iraq, Kuwait, Bahrain, Haiti, Honduras, Djbouti and Kosovo. On her overseas tours, she refers to herself as the "NATIONAL MOM".

Montgomery has directed and developed solo performance shows including Jim Florentine's I'm Your Savior and The Lighter Side Of Death by Jim Mendrinos. More recently she was supervising producer on two television specials: Shang is Shangry and Paul Ogata: All Lies.

Her most recent project, Funny Women of A Certain Age, premiered on the Showtime Network in March 2019. It made history as the first TV comedy special to feature female comics over the age of 50.

She has also been a blogger for the Huffington Post.

References

External links

 http://www.carolemontgomery.com
 http://www.nationalmom.com
 https://www.facebook.com/carolemontgomerycomedian

1958 births
American stand-up comedians
Living people
American women comedians
21st-century American women